The 2018–19 Liga MX Femenil season was the second season of the top-flight women's football league in Mexico. The season was contested by eighteen teams, all being the counterpart women's teams of the men's league clubs Liga MX. The season was split into two championships—the Torneo Apertura and the Torneo Clausura—each in an identical format and each contested by the same eighteen teams. Unlike the inaugural season, all eighteen Liga MX clubs fielded a women's team.

Teams, stadiums, and personnel
The following eighteen teams competed this season. Puebla and Lobos BUAP are fielding a team for the first time.

Stadiums and locations

Alternate venues
 América – Cancha Centenario No. 5
 Atlas – Estadio Colomos Alfredo 'Pistache' Torres (Capacity: 3,000)
 Guadalajara – Verde Valle
 Monterrey – El Barrial (Capacity: 570)
 UANL – Instalaciones Zuazua (Capacity: 800)

Personnel and kits

Format
The Liga MX Femenil season is split into two championships: the Torneo Apertura (opening tournament) and the Torneo Clausura (closing tournament). Each is contested in an identical format and includes the same eighteen teams.

The teams were divided into two groups of nine, the best four of each group advancing to the quarterfinals of the Liguilla.

Changes
Due to the addition of Lobos BUAP and Puebla, this season consisted of two groups of nine teams, instead of two groups of eight.
The Liguilla (playoffs) will now consist of a quarterfinals round, as a result, eight teams (four from each group) will now qualify to the Liguilla.
This season will consist of 18 rounds (up from 14).
Morelia moved from Group 1 to Group 2.
Two teams (one from each group) will rest each round.

Torneo Apertura
The Apertura 2018 regular season started on 13 July and ended on 19 November.

Regular season

League table

Group 1

Group 2

Positions by round
The table lists the positions of teams after each week of matches. In order to preserve chronological evolvements, any postponed matches are not included in the round at which they were originally scheduled, but added to the full round they were played immediately afterwards. For example, if a match is scheduled for matchday 8, but then postponed and played between days 11 and 12, it will be added to the standings for day 12.

Results
Group 1

Group 2

Top goalscorers
Players sorted first by goals scored, then by last name.

Source: Liga MX Femenil

Attendance

Per team

Highest and lowest

Source: Liga MX

Liguilla – Apertura

Bracket 

 The top four clubs of each group qualify
 The eight clubs who qualified will be ranked and seeded 1 to 8 based on performance in the regular season
 Teams may be re-seeded each round.
 Team with more goals on aggregate after two matches advances.
 Away goals rule is applied in the quarterfinals and semifinals, but not the final.
 In the quarterfinals and semifinals, if the two teams are tied on aggregate and away goals, the higher seeded team advances.
 In the final, if the two teams are tied after both legs, the match goes to extra-time and, if necessary, a shootout.

Quarterfinals

First leg

Second leg

Semifinals

First leg

Second leg

Finals

First leg

Second leg

Torneo Clausura
The Clausura 2019 is the second championship of the season. The regular season started on 4 January 2019 and will end on 24 April 2019.

Regular season

League table

Group 1

Group 2

Positions by round
The table lists the positions of teams after each week of matches. In order to preserve chronological evolvements, any postponed matches are not included in the round at which they were originally scheduled, but added to the full round they were played immediately afterwards. For example, if a match is scheduled for matchday 8, but then postponed and played between days 11 and 12, it will be added to the standings for day 12.

Results
Group 1

Group 2

Top goalscorers
Players sorted first by goals scored, then by last name.

Source: Liga Mx Femenil

Attendance

Per team

Highest and lowest

Source: Liga MX

Liguilla – Clausura

Bracket 

 The top four clubs of each group qualify.
 The eight clubs who qualified will be ranked and seeded 1 to 8 based on performance in the regular season.
 Teams may be reseeded each round.
 Team with more goals on aggregate after two matches advances.
 Away goals rule is applied in the quarterfinals and semifinals, but not the final.
 In the quarterfinals and semifinals, if the two teams are tied on aggregate and away goals, the higher seeded team advances.
 In the final, if the two teams are tied after both legs, the match goes to extra-time and, if necessary, a shootout.

Quarterfinals

First leg

Second leg

Semifinals

First leg

Second leg

Finals

First leg

Second leg

Notes

References

External links
 Official website of Liga MX Femenil

Liga MX Femenil
MX Femenil
1